Dexopollenia bicoloripes is a species of cluster fly in the family Polleniidae.

Distribution
Malaysia.

References

Polleniidae
Insects described in 1931
Diptera of Asia